Edward Frederick Easson (29 July 1905 – 11 February 1988) was a Scottish Episcopal Church bishop of the Diocese of Aberdeen and Orkney in Scotland from 1956 to 1972 and Dean of Aberdeen and Orkney from 1953 to 1956.

Biography
He was educated at Morgan Academy, the University of St Andrews and Edinburgh Theological College. He was a Maths and Science teacher at Lasswade Secondary School from 1929 to 1931; Assistant Curate of St Peter, Edinburgh from 1933 to 1936; and of St Aidan, Craigmillar from 1936 to 1939; Rector of St Peter, Peterhead from 1940 to 1948; and of St Devenick, Bieldside until his appointment as Dean.

References

1905 births
1988 deaths
People educated at Morgan Academy
Alumni of the University of St Andrews
Alumni of Edinburgh Theological College
Bishops of Aberdeen and Orkney
Deans of Aberdeen and Orkney
20th-century Scottish Episcopalian bishops